Warren Linn (born 10 September 1954) is a New Zealand former cricketer. He played first-class and List A cricket for Auckland and List A cricket for Central Districts.

See also
 List of Auckland representative cricketers

References

External links
 

1954 births
Living people
New Zealand cricketers
Auckland cricketers
Central Districts cricketers
Cricketers from Hāwera